Rich Kidz (formerly known as Rich Kids) is an American hip hop group from Atlanta, Georgia, formed in 2008. In 2012, they were signed to Columbia Records.

Departure
Jose Guapo left the group to pursue solo career after reports of mismanagement at Grand Hustle Records. Jose Guapo is currently under Quality Control Music and has his own label called XVL.
Shad da God, formerly known as Rich Kid Shawty, is the cousin of T.I. Shad is currently signed to Grand Hustle Records. 
Skooly, while still a part of Rich Kidz, went on to pursue his solo career as an artist. Skooly has produced tracks throughout Atlanta and is even signed to 2 Chainz's label T.R.U.

Discography

Extended plays
2009: Album Titled Money Swag
2014: Y.A.R.S
2015: The Blacc Jon Gotti (Skooly)
2015: I Want Them Millions (Huncho Kae)
2015: Straight Off The Porch (CosaNostra Kidd)
2016: CCM YaYo (CosaNostra Yayo)
2016: Trench Gotti (Skooly)
2016: Fucc The Middle Man (CosaNostra Kidd)
2016: Misunderstood (CosaNostra Yayo)
2016: King Cosa (Skooly)
2016: Prince Cosa (CosaNostra Yayo)
2017:  Born To Lose Built To Win (CosaNostra Yayo)
2017: Young Direct Deposit (CosaNostra Kidd)
2018: Don't You Ever Forget Me (Skooly)

Albums
2017: Baccwards Feelings (Skooly)
2020: Nobody Likes Me (Skooly)

Mixtapes

Main-artist singles

References

African-American musical groups
American hip hop groups
Columbia Records artists
Hip hop duos
Musical groups from Atlanta
Rappers from Atlanta
Southern hip hop groups
American musical duos